Tommaso Dal Molin Stadium is a stadium located in Arzignano, Italy.

The stadium is named for Tommaso Dal Molin, a prominent Regia Aeronautica (Italian Royal Air Force) aerobatic and racing pilot of the 1920s who died in a floatplane crash in Lake Garda in January 1930.

References

Sports venues in Veneto
Football venues in Italy